Jason Alejandro Silva Pérez (born February 13, 1991) is a Chilean footballer who plays for Real San Joaquín of the Segunda División Profesional de Chile.

Career
A product of Palestino youth system, he played on loan at Colo-Colo from 2013 to 2014. In 2017, he joined Cypriot side Apollon Limassol, playing at the Europe League. On second half 2018, he joined San Marcos de Arica in the Primera B de Chile.

He tried to return to football by joining Ecuadorian side Fuerza Amarilla in 2020 and Deportes Concepción in 2021. In 2022, he returned to the activity after joining Real San Joaquín in the Segunda División Profesional de Chile.

Controversies
In 6 April 2014, while he played for Colo-Colo in the Chilean Superclásico, he trampled a Universidad de Chile flag, being arrested for inciting to violence. 

In 2019, he was arrested for drunk driving, carrying a fake driver license and bribing the police.

In 2020, he was arrested in the context of a police operation called Operación Clon (Clone Operation), what investigated a criminal band focused on a kind of crime called portonazo (gate robbery) in Chile and South America consisting of taking cars violently.

Honours
Colo-Colo
 Chilean Primera División (1): 2014 Clausura

Apollon Limassol 
 Cypriot Super Cup (1): 2017

References

External links
 Profile at BDFA
 

1991 births
Living people
Footballers from Santiago
Chilean footballers
Club Deportivo Palestino footballers
Colo-Colo footballers
C.D. Antofagasta footballers
Unión La Calera footballers
Apollon Limassol FC players
San Marcos de Arica footballers
Chilean Primera División players
Cypriot First Division players
Primera B de Chile players
Segunda División Profesional de Chile players
Chilean expatriate sportspeople in Cyprus
Expatriate footballers in Cyprus
Association football midfielders